Saint-Nicolas-des-Bois may refer to the following communes in France:

Saint-Nicolas-des-Bois, Manche, in the Manche département
Saint-Nicolas-des-Bois, Orne, in the Orne  département

See also

Saint-Nicolas-aux-Bois, in the Aisne  département